Resuscitation of a Hanged Man is a novel by Denis Johnson published in 1991 by Farrar, Straus and Giroux.

The story explores the struggles of a private investigator, Leonard English, to become a person of religious faith, and his isolated descent into madness.

Plot

Critical assessment
Critic Mona Simpson, testifying to Johnson's "ability to write a gorgeous sentence", registers this critique of Resuscitation of a Hanged Man:

Theme
Critic David L. Ulin argues that the thematic center of The Resuscitation of a Hanged Man—"the key to the entire novel"—resides in the protagonist Leonard English's inability to distinguish his "brief, intense flashes of the starkest lucency" from his bouts of dementia. The protagonist laments that "our delusions are just as likely to be real as our most careful scientific observations."
 Johnson renders striking descriptions of the real world from which English crafts his delusions which serve to illustrate his character's descent into madness. Ulin offers this caveat:

Literary critic Mona Simpson notes that "Roman Catholicism is a persistent theme in Mr. Johnson's work...evincing a deep attraction to the lavish emblems and ritual of the Mass."

Johnson "flirts" with the detective genre in this novel—Simpson compares English with the investigator Jake Gittes in Chinatown (1974)—however, the thematic element in The Resuscitation of a Hanged Man is "God", according to critic Aaron Thier: "God the metaphor, God the stylistic trope, God the real and eternal being..."

Simpson comments on Johnson's development of his subsidiary characters in a novel in which the protagonist searches for his "doppelgänger":

Footnotes

Sources 
 
 
 
 
 
 
 

1991 American novels
American detective novels
Farrar, Straus and Giroux books
Fictional amateur detectives
Novels by Denis Johnson
Novels set in Boston
Novels set in Massachusetts
Novels set in New Hampshire
Novels set on Cape Cod and the Islands
Postmodern novels
Catholicism in fiction